Robert Coote (4 February 1909 – 26 November 1982) was an English actor. He played aristocrats or British military types in many films, and created the role of Colonel Hugh Pickering in the long-running original Broadway production of My Fair Lady.

Biography
Coote was born in London and educated at Hurstpierpoint College in Sussex. He began his stage career at the age of 16, performing in Britain, South Africa, and Australia before arriving in Hollywood in the late 1930s. He played a succession of pompous British types in supporting roles, including a brief but memorable turn as Sgt. Bertie Higginbotham in Gunga Din (1939). His acting career was interrupted by his service as a squadron leader in the Royal Canadian Air Force during World War II. He played Bob Trubshawe in Powell and Pressburger's A Matter of Life and Death (1946), chosen for the first-ever Royal Film Performance on 1 November 1946, before he returned to Hollywood, where his films included The Ghost and Mrs. Muir (1947), Forever Amber (1947), The Three Musketeers (1948), and Orson Welles' Othello (1951).

In 1956, Coote created the role of Colonel Pickering in the original Broadway production of My Fair Lady (1956–62), which he reprised in the musical's 1976–77 Broadway revival. He also originated the role of King Pellinore in the Broadway production of Camelot (1960–63). He was nominated for an Emmy Award for his performance as Timmy St. Clair in the NBC TV series The Rogues (1964–65). In 1966, Coote appeared with Jackie Gleason and Art Carney in an episode of The Honeymooners entitled "The Honeymooners in England", broadcast on CBS-TV from Miami.

In his last feature film performance, Coote portrayed one of the critics dispatched by Vincent Price in Theatre of Blood (1973).

Coote guest-starred in an episode of the 1979 NBC television anthology series $weepstake$. His final role was on television, playing orchid nurse Theodore Horstmann in the 1981 NBC-TV series Nero Wolfe, starring William Conrad in the title role. In most film and TV adaptations of Nero Wolfe mysteries, before and since, Horstmann has been a very minor character, but Coote's Horstmann got considerable screen time in the series.

The veteran British character actor died in his sleep at the New York Athletic Club in November 1982, at the age of 73.

Coote was a close friend of actor David Niven, sharing a house with Niven for a time in the late 1930s and living in a flat over Niven's garage for several years after the Second World War.

Partial filmography

 Sally in Our Alley (1931) as Waiter At Party (uncredited)
 Loyalties (1933) as Robert
 Radio Parade of 1935 (1934) as Executive
 Rangle River (1936) as Reggie Mannister, Flight-Lieutenant
 The Thirteenth Chair (1937) as Stanby
 The Sheik Steps Out (1937) as Lord Eustace Byington
 A Yank at Oxford (1938) as Wavertree
 Blond Cheat (1938) as Gilbert Potts
 The Girl Downstairs (1938) as Karl, Paul's Butler
 Mr. Moto's Last Warning (1939) as Rollo Venables
 Gunga Din (1939) as Sgt. Bertie Higginbotham
 The House of Fear (1939) as Robert Morton
 Bad Lands (1939) as Eaton
 Nurse Edith Cavell (1939) as Bungey
 Vigil in the Night (1940) as Dr. Caley
 You Can't Fool Your Wife (1940) as 'Batty' Battincourt
 Commandos Strike at Dawn (1942) as Robert Bowen
 Forever and a Day (1943) as Blind Officer
 A Matter of Life and Death (1946) as Bob Trubshawe
 Cloak and Dagger (1946) as Cronin (uncredited)
 The Ghost and Mrs. Muir (1947) as Mr. Coombe
 Lured (1947) as Detective
 The Exile (1947) as Dick Pinner
 Forever Amber (1947) as Sir Thomas Dudley
 Berlin Express (1948) as Sterling
 The Three Musketeers (1948) as Aramis
 The Red Danube (1949) as Brigadier C.M.V. Catlock
 The Elusive Pimpernel (1950) as Sir Andrew ffloulkes
 Soldiers Three (1951) as Maj. Mercer
 The Lavender Hill Mob (1951) as Waiter in Restaurant (uncredited)
 The Desert Fox: The Story of Rommel (1951) as British Medical Officer (uncredited)
 Othello (1951) as Roderigo
 Scaramouche (1952) as Gaston Binet
 The Merry Widow (1952) as Marquis De Crillon
 The Prisoner of Zenda (1952) as Fritz von Tarlenheim
 The Constant Husband (1955) as Friends and Relations: The Best Man
 The Swan (1956) as Capt. Wunderlich
 Merry Andrew (1958) as Dudley Larabee
 The Horse's Mouth (1958) as Sir William Beeder
 The League of Gentlemen (1960) as Bunny Warren
 The V.I.P.s (1963) as John Coburn
 The Rogues (1964–1965, TV Series) as Timmy St. Clair
 The Golden Head (1964) as Braithwaite
 A Man Could Get Killed (1966) as Hatton / Jones
 The Swinger (1966) as Sir Hubert Charles
 The Cool Ones (1967) as Stanley Krumley
 The Whitehall Worrier (1967, TV series) as Rt. Hon. Mervyn Pugh
 Prudence and the Pill (1968) as Henry Hardcastle
 Kenner (1969) as Henderson
 Up the Front (1972) as General Burke
 Theatre of Blood (1973) as Oliver Larding
 Institute for Revenge (1979, TV Movie) as Wellington
 Nero Wolfe (1981, TV Series) as Theodore Horstmann (final appearance)

References

External links

 
 
  Robert Coote performances in Theatre Archive, University of Bristol

1909 births
1982 deaths
English male film actors
People educated at Hurstpierpoint College
20th-century English male actors
Male actors from London
British expatriate male actors in the United States
Royal Canadian Air Force personnel of World War II
Royal Canadian Air Force officers